The women's 100 metres hurdles at the 2022 Commonwealth Games, as part of the athletics programme, took place in the Alexander Stadium on 5 and 7 August 2022.

Records
Prior to this competition, the existing world and Games records were as follows:

Schedule
The schedule was as follows:

All times are British Summer Time (UTC+1)

Results

First round
The first round consisted of three heats. The two fastest competitors per heat (plus two fastest non-automatic qualifiers) advanced to the final.

Wind: Heat 1: +2.5 m/s, Heat 2: +2.0 m/s, Heat 3: +2.4 m/s

Final
The medals were determined in the final.

Wind: -0.2 m/s

References

Women's 100 metres hurdles
2022
2022 in women's athletics